I'd Rather Lead a Band is an album by Loudon Wainwright III, released in 2020. The album has songs by Harold Arlen, Frank Loesser, Rodgers and Hart, and Fats Waller.

Track listing
	
 "How I Love You (I'm Tellin' the Birds, Tellin' the Bees)" 03:26		
 "A Ship Without a Sail" 03:57
 "Ain't Misbehavin'" 03:04	
 "I'm Going to Give It to Mary With Love" 03:16	
 "The Little Things in Life" 03:34	
 "So the Bluebirds and the Blackbirds Got Together" 02:53	
 "A Perfect Day" 02:40	
 "I Thought About You" 02:48	
 "I'd Rather Lead a Band" 03:41	
 "My Blue Heaven" 02:52	
 "Between the Devil and the Deep Blue Sea" 03:06	
 "Heart and Soul" 02:38	
 "You Rascal You (I'll Be Glad When You're Dead)" 02:59	
 "More I Cannot Wish You" 03:05

References

Loudon Wainwright III albums
2020 albums